Albert Bunjaku (born 29 November 1983) is a Kosovar professional footballer who plays as a striker for German club Bonner SC. Having previously represented Switzerland, participating at the 2010 FIFA World Cup, he switched to the newly formed Kosovo national team.

Club career 
When Bunjaku was eight years old, he moved with his mother and two brothers to Switzerland, where his father was already working. Bunjaku joined his first club at 13 – unusually late for a future professional. Before starting out with FC Schlieren, he only played football in the schoolyard or on the five-a-side court. At that stage he was also very keen on basketball.

Bunjaku's first step on the professional ladder was at FC Schaffhausen in the Challenge League, Switzerland's second division. The team won promotion to the Super League in 2003–04 and over the course of the next 18 months the young forward made 39 top-flight appearances.

In January 2006, the 23-year-old Bunjaku left Schaffhausen for 2. Bundesliga side SC Paderborn. His first staging post in Germany was destined to last just six months however, as he failed to establish himself under then-coach Jos Luhukay. "At the time I didn't have the feeling he was Bundesliga material", Luhukay says now. As a result, Bunjaku found himself unemployed in the summer of 2006.

Then however, a chance conversation turned Bunjaku's fortunes around. His wife Arieta worked in a boutique in Paderborn frequented by the wife of former Paderborn coach Pavel Dochev. They struck up a conversation and it transpired that Dotchev, now in charge of Rot-Weiß Erfurt, was on the lookout for a striker. No sooner said than done, and Bunjaku was on the move to third-division Erfurt.

He first came to the attention of the wider footballing public when Rot-Weiß Erfurt took on Bayern Munich in a DFB Cup tie on 10 August 2008. Coming on as a second-half substitute in what was Jürgen Klinsmann's competitive debut as Bayern coach, Bunjaku put two goals past the record champions, who eventually squeezed past their lower-league opponents 4–3.

International career 
On 14 November 2009, Bunjaku made his international debut for Switzerland in the 1–0 home loss to Norway in a friendly match after coming on as a substitute for Alexander Frei at half time. He was part of the Swiss squad for the 2010 FIFA World Cup, playing the last 13 minutes of the group match against Chile after coming on for Gelson Fernandes. Bunjaku played in Kosovo's first FIFA-approved match, against Haiti in a 0–0 home friendly on 5 March 2014. Bunjaku played for Kosovo against Turkey on 21 May 2014 and scored its first international goal.

International goals

Scores and results list Kosovo's goal tally first, score column indicates score after each Bunjaku goal.

References

External links
 
 

1983 births
Living people
Swiss people of Albanian descent
Swiss people of Kosovan descent
Kosovo Albanians
People from Gjilan
Kosovan emigrants to Switzerland
Swiss men's footballers
Kosovan footballers
Association football forwards
Grasshopper Club Zürich players
SC Young Fellows Juventus players
FC Schaffhausen players
SC Paderborn 07 players
FC Rot-Weiß Erfurt players
1. FC Nürnberg players
1. FC Kaiserslautern players
FC St. Gallen players
FC Erzgebirge Aue players
FC Viktoria Köln players
Bonner SC players
Swiss Super League players
2. Bundesliga players
3. Liga players
Bundesliga players
Switzerland under-21 international footballers
Switzerland international footballers
2010 FIFA World Cup players
Dual internationalists (football)
Kosovo international footballers
Swiss expatriate footballers
Swiss expatriate sportspeople in Germany
Kosovan expatriate footballers
Kosovan expatriate sportspeople in Germany
Expatriate footballers in Germany